The term Indonesian languages may refer to:

 Languages of Indonesia, or,
 an old term for Hesperonesian languages.